Francesco da Stilo, O.P. (died 1489) was a Roman Catholic prelate who served as Bishop of Lipari (1461–1489).

Biography
Francesco da Stilo was born ordained a priest in the Order of Preachers.
On 19 June 1461, he was appointed during the papacy of Pope Pius II as Bishop of Lipari.
He served as Bishop of Lipari until his death in 1489. 
While bishop, he was the principal co-consecrator of Dalmazio Gabrielli, Bishop of Siracusa (1469).

References

External links and additional sources
 (for Chronology of Bishops) 
 (for Chronology of Bishops) 

15th-century Italian Roman Catholic bishops
Bishops appointed by Pope Pius II
1489 deaths
Dominican bishops